Ruggles House may refer to:

Ruggles House (Maine) in Columbia Falls, Maine
Draper Ruggles House in Worcester, Massachusetts 
Lucy Ruggles House in Burlington, Vermont 
Ruggles Woodbridge House, South Hadley, Hampshire County, Massachusetts